The 2019 World Series was the championship series of Major League Baseball's 2019 season.

2019 World Series may also refer to:

Baseball
 2019 Little League World Series
 2019 Intermediate League World Series
 2019 Junior League World Series
 2019 Senior League World Series
 2019 College World Series

Other
 2019 Red Bull Cliff Diving World Series
 2019 World Series of Darts
 2019 FINA Diving World Series
 2019 World Series of Poker
 2019 World Series of Poker Europe
 2019 FINA Marathon Swim World Series
 2019–20 America's Cup World Series